Mthunzi Mkhontfo (born 28 December 1994) is a Swazi footballer.

International career

International goals
Scores and results list eSwatini's goal tally first.

References

External links 
 

1994 births
Living people
Eswatini international footballers
Association football midfielders
Swazi footballers